Bronocice  is a village in the administrative district of Gmina Działoszyce, within Pińczów County, Świętokrzyskie Voivodeship, in south-central Poland. In 1976 the Bronocice pot was discovered. Dating to approximately  3635–3370 BC, the pot bears the earliest known image of a wheeled vehicle.

References

Bronocice